Hendon was a rural district in Middlesex, England from 1894 to 1934.

The rural district was established in 1894 under the Local Government Act 1894, consisting of the following parishes:

The parish of Hendon became an urban district in the same act, and existed alongside Hendon RD.

By the 1930s it had become increasingly urbanised, and under the review caused by the Local Government Act 1929, was abolished.  It went to form the Harrow urban district, with the parish of Edgware having become part of the Municipal Borough of Hendon in 1932.

References
 Vision of Britain Hendon Rural District

Districts of England created by the Local Government Act 1894
History of local government in London (1889–1965)
History of local government in Middlesex
Rural districts of England
Hendon